Here are some of the more commonly known problems that are PSPACE-complete when expressed as decision problems. This list is in no way comprehensive.

Games and puzzles 
Generalized versions of:

 Amazons
 Atomix
 Checkers
 Dyson Telescope Game
 Cross Purposes
 Geography
 Two-player game version of Instant Insanity
 Ko-free Go
 Ladder capturing in Go
 Gomoku
 Hex
 Konane
 Lemmings
 Node Kayles
 Poset Game
 Reversi
 River Crossing
 Rush Hour
 Finding optimal play in Mahjong solitaire
 Sokoban
 Super Mario Bros.
 Black Pebble game
 Black-White Pebble game
 Acyclic pebble game
 One-player pebble game
 Token on acyclic directed graph games:
 Annihilation
 Hit
 Capture
 Edge Blocking
 Target
 Pursuit

Logic 

 Quantified boolean formulas

 First-order logic of equality
 Provability in intuitionistic propositional logic
 Satisfaction in modal logic S4
 First-order theory of the natural numbers under the successor operation
 First-order theory of the natural numbers under the standard order
 First-order theory of the integers under the standard order
 First-order theory of well-ordered sets
 First-order theory of binary strings under lexicographic ordering
 First-order theory of a finite Boolean algebra
 Stochastic satisfiability
 Linear temporal logic satisfiability and model checking

 Temporal logic of 2D Minkowski Spacetime.

Lambda calculus 
Type inhabitation problem for simply typed lambda calculus

Automata and language theory

Circuit theory 
Integer circuit evaluation

Automata theory 

 Word problem for linear bounded automata
 Word problem for quasi-realtime automata
 Emptiness problem for a nondeterministic two-way finite state automaton
 Equivalence problem for nondeterministic finite automata
 Word problem and emptiness problem for non-erasing stack automata
 Emptiness of intersection of an unbounded number of deterministic finite automata

 A generalized version of Langton's Ant
 Minimizing nondeterministic finite automata

Formal languages 

 Word problem for context-sensitive language
 Intersection emptiness for an unbounded number of regular languages 
 Regular Expression Star-Freeness 
 Equivalence problem for regular expressions
 Emptiness problem for regular expressions with intersection.
 Equivalence problem for star-free regular expressions with squaring.
 Covering for linear grammars
 Structural equivalence for linear grammars
 Equivalence problem for Regular grammars
 Emptiness problem for ET0L grammars
 Word problem for ET0L grammars
 Tree transducer language membership problem for top down finite-state tree transducers

Graph theory 

 succinct versions of many graph problems, with graphs represented as Boolean circuits, ordered binary decision diagrams or other related representations:
 s-t reachability problem for succinct graphs. This is essentially the same as the simplest plan existence problem in automated planning and scheduling.
 planarity of succinct graphs
 acyclicity of succinct graphs
 connectedness of succinct graphs
 existence of Eulerian paths in a succinct graph
 Bounded two-player Constraint Logic
 Canadian traveller problem.
 Determining whether routes selected by the Border Gateway Protocol will eventually converge to a stable state for a given set of path preferences
 Deterministic constraint logic (unbounded)
 Dynamic graph reliability.
 Graph coloring game
 Node Kayles game and clique-forming game: two players alternately select vertices and the induced subgraph must be an independent set (resp. clique). The last to play wins.
 Nondeterministic Constraint Logic (unbounded)

Others 

 Finite horizon POMDPs (Partially Observable Markov Decision Processes). 
 Hidden Model MDPs (hmMDPs). 
 Dynamic Markov process.
 Detection of inclusion dependencies in a relational database
 Computation of any Nash equilibrium of a 2-player normal-form game, that may be obtained via the Lemke–Howson algorithm.
 The Corridor Tiling Problem: given a set of Wang tiles, a chosen tile  and a width  given in unary notation, is there any height  such that an  rectangle can be tiled such that all the border tiles are ?

See also 

 List of NP-complete problems

Notes

References 

 Eppstein's page on computational complexity of games
 The Complexity of Approximating PSPACE-complete problems for hierarchical specifications

Mathematics-related lists
 
Lists of problems